John Alastair Heard (born 11 February 1939) is an Australian former basketball player. He competed in the men's tournament at the 1964 Summer Olympics.

References

1939 births
Living people
Australian men's basketball players
Olympic basketball players of Australia
Basketball players at the 1964 Summer Olympics
Basketball players from Adelaide